Jean-Michel Ribes (born 15 December 1946, in Paris) is a French playwright, screenwriter, theatre director, film maker and actor. Since 2002 he has been the managing director of the Théâtre du Rond-Point.

Between 1982 and 1984 Ribes had directed Merci Bernard and since 1988 works on Palace. In 2008, Ribes had directed Batailles which he co-wrote with Roland Topor and next year became a director of the Un garçon impossible, a play by Petter S. Rosenlund and 's Les Diablogues. In 2010, in Théâtre du Rond-Point he directed Les Nouvelles Brèves de Comptoir in which Jean-Marie Gourio had starred. In 2011, he wrote and directed René l’énervé - Opéra bouffe et tumultueux, on the music by Reinhardt Wagner. A year later, he returned to Théâtre du Rond-Point at which he directed play Théâtre sans animaux and Sébastien Thiéry's L’Origine du Monde in 2013.

Theater

Filmography
1978: The Swindle
1986: La galette du roi
1993: Chacun pour toi
2008: A Day at the Museum
2014: Brèves de comptoir

Awards
2001: Plaisir du Théâtre Award
2007: Chevalier (Knight) of the Légion d'honneur

References

External links

Portrait of Jean-Michel Ribes by Braun-Vega

1946 births
Living people
Chevaliers of the Légion d'honneur
French male film actors
French film directors
French male stage actors
French male screenwriters
French screenwriters
French theatre directors